The Suzanne J. Levinson Prize is a prize of the History of Science Society, awarded biennially and established in 2006. The prize is given to the author of "a book in the history of the life sciences and natural history," published in the previous four years.

The following authors have won the Levinson Prize:
2006 Prize - Sandra Herbert, Charles Darwin: Geologist 
2008 Prize - Hannah Landecker, Culturing Life: How Cells Became Technologies 
2010 Prize - Gregory Radick, The Simian Tongue: The Long Debate about Animal Language .
2012 Prize - Martin Rudwick, Worlds before Adam: The Reconstruction of Geohistory in the Age of Reform 
2014 Prize - Daniela Bleichmar, Visible Empire.Botanical Expeditions and Visual Culture in the Hispanic Enlightenment 
2016 Prize - Nick Hopwood, Haeckel’s Embryos: Images, Evolution, and Fraud 
2018 Prize - Evelleen Richards, Darwin and the Making of Sexual Selection  
2020 Prize - Erika Lorraine Milam, Creatures of Cain: The Hunt for Human Nature in Cold War America

See also

 List of history awards

External links 
 History of Science Society: Suzanne J. Levinson Prize

History of science awards
Awards established in 2006
American awards
2006 establishments in the United States